Baintown is a hamlet located in Fife, a council area of Scotland, UK.

Hamlets in Fife